Ricardo Diaz may refer to:
 Ricardo Diaz (comics), a DC Comics character
 Ricardo Diaz (Arrowverse), the Arrowverse version of the character
 Ricardo Diaz (Grand Theft Auto: Vice City), a character in Grand Theft Auto: Vice City
 Ricardo Diaz Bach, a Salvadoran footballer